John Carlton Gardiner (8 May 1881 – 3 April 1967) was an Australian rules footballer who played for Carlton and Melbourne in the Victorian Football League (VFL). He then became a successful coach in the Tasmanian Football League.

Family
The son of John Gardiner, and Anna Gardiner, née Sidley, John Carlton Gardiner was born on 8 May 1881. Jack Gardiner was the third of four children in the family, with two older sisters and a younger brother, Vin Gardiner.

He married Florence Bucirde (1883–1946), in Hobart, on 20 November 1911.

Jack Gardiner died in Hobart in 1967, and is buried at Cornelian Bay Cemetery.

Football
Gardiner came from a football playing family with his father, John, a Carlton player during the 1870s. Vin Gardiner, his younger brother, also played at both Melbourne and Carlton.

His VFL career, spent mostly as a rover, began with two seasons at his father's club before switching to Melbourne in 1903. He kicked 24 goals in 1904 and was a regular in the Melbourne side until 1907.

The rover spent the 1908 season in Tasmania, as an umpire and coach of the TFL representative team. He returned to the mainland to coach Tasmania at the 1908 Melbourne Carnival and stopped umpiring after that year.

He resumed his playing career in 1909 when he joined Cananore as captain. His tenure included four TFL premierships, including three in a row from 1909 to 1911. Gardiner also captained the state at the 1911 Adelaide Carnival. Appointed Cananore captain-coach following the war, he steered them to more premierships in 1921 and 1922. His final port of call was North Hobart, with which he spent the 1924 and 1925 seasons at before retiring.

In 2005, Gardiner was one of the inaugural inductees into the Tasmanian Football Hall of Fame.

His son, Jack Jr, also played football and represented Tasmania as the state wicket-keeper in cricket.

See also
 1908 Melbourne Carnival
 1911 Adelaide Carnival

Footnotes

References
 Holmesby, Russell and Main, Jim (2007). The Encyclopedia of AFL Footballers. 7th ed. Melbourne: Bas Publishing.
 Jack Gardiner: His Splendid Football Career: A Brief Sketch, The Mercury, (Friday, 24 August 1923), p.10.

External links

 
 
 Blueseum: Jack Gardiner
 Jack Gardiner at Demonwiki.

1881 births
1967 deaths
Carlton Football Club players
Melbourne Football Club players
Cananore Football Club players
North Hobart Football Club players
North Hobart Football Club coaches
Australian rules football umpires
Australian rules footballers from Melbourne
Tasmanian Football Hall of Fame inductees
Burials in Tasmania
People from Carlton, Victoria